Speechless is the ninth studio album by American contemporary Christian music singer and songwriter Steven Curtis Chapman. It was released on June 3, 1999, by Sparrow Records.

It was certified platinum by the RIAA on November 27, 2000. Chapman received the 2000 Grammy Award for Best Pop/Contemporary Gospel Album and Dove Awards for Pop/Contemporary Album of the Year and Pop/Contemporary Recorded Song of the Year (for "Dive").

The album provided more No. 1 chart singles (seven) on Christian contemporary radio than any of Chapman's other albums: "The Change", "Fingerprints of God", "The Invitation", "Great Expectations", "Be Still And Know", "Dive" and the title song "Speechless". The album is considered one of Chapman's greater works by many and is recognized by many as being one of the best Christian albums of all time.

The concert tour in support of Speechless featured Chapman's longtime friend and co-writer Geoff Moore.

Track listing
All songs were written by Steven Curtis Chapman, except where noted.
 "Dive" – 3:57
 "Speechless" (Chapman, Geoff Moore) – 5:06
 "The Change" (Chapman, James Issac Elliot) – 3:46
 "Great Expectations" – 5:02
 "Next 5 Minutes" (Adam Anders, Chapman) – 4:19
 "Fingerprints of God" – 4:02
 "The Invitation" (Chapman, Moore) – 4:57
 "Whatever" – 4:01
 "I Do Believe" – 4:01
 "What I Really Want to Say" – 4:22
 "With Hope" – 5:12
 "The Journey" (Chapman, J.A.C. Redford) – 3:05
 "Be Still and Know" – 3:19

Track information
 Chapman dedicated the song "Fingerprints of God" to his daughter Emily who, at the time had turned 13.
 "With Hope" was written for a family, the Mullicans (friends of the Chapmans), who lost a child. It was later sung in honor of the victims of the shooting at Heath High School in Paducah, Kentucky, Chapman's alma mater.
 "What I Really Want to Say" is dedicated to Chapman's wife, Mary Beth.

Personnel 

Musicians
 Steven Curtis Chapman – lead vocals, backing vocals (1-6, 8, 9), acoustic guitar (1, 2, 4-11), electric guitar (1, 3, 4, 6, 7, 9, 10, 11), dobro (1, 5, 8), "Papoose" guitar (2, 3), mandolin (2, 7), synth solo (8), track arrangements
 Randy Pearce – electric guitar (1-11), track arrangement (5), acoustic guitar (7)
 Scott Sheriff – backing vocals (1, 3, 6, 8), acoustic piano (4), Hammond B3 organ (6)
 Shane Keister – acoustic piano (2, 13)
 Hardy Hemphill – acoustic piano (11)
 Adam Anders – programming (1-4, 8, 9, 10), bass (1-11), track arrangement (1, 3, 4, 5, 9, 10)
 Will Denton – drum loops (1), drums (2, 3, 5-8, 10, 11), track arrangement (5)
 Eric Darken – percussion (2, 8, 10)
 The London Session Orchestra – strings (2, 3, 4, 7, 10, 12, 13)
 Gavyn Wright – concertmaster
 J.A.C. Redford – orchestral arrangement (2, 4, 7, 12, 13)
 Carl Marsh – orchestral arrangement (3, 10)
 Chris Eaton – backing vocals (9)

Choir on "Speechless"
 Marvin Copaus, Shari Davis, Teresa Easterling, Rhonda Hampton, Hardy Hemphill,  Stacy Jeanette, Scott Sheriff, Mark Smeby, Layde Love Smith, Andy Sperry, Scot Tyler and Tina Tyler 

Scripture reading on "The Change"
 Emily Chapman, Caleb Chapman and Will Franklin Chapman Handclaps on "Fingerprints of God"'''
 Steve Bishir, Steven Curtis Chapman, Ray Mullican, Hank Nirider and David Trask

Production 
 Brown Bannister – producer
 Steven Curtis Chapman – producer
 Peter York  – executive producer
 Dan Raines – executive producer
 Bill Baumgart – A&R coordinator
 Steve Bishir – recording, mixing
 The Sound Kitchen (Franklin, Tennessee) – recording location, mixing location
 Hank Nirider – recording assistant, mix assistant, additional engineering
 Jedd Hackett – recording assistant
 Melissa Mattey – recording assistant
 JB – additional engineering
 Patrick Kelly – additional engineering
 Gary Paczosa – additional engineering
 Aaron Swihart – additional engineering
 Shane D. Wilson – additional engineering
 Mark Tucker – orchestra recording
 Abbey Road Studio (London, England) – orchestra recording location
 Andrew Dudman – orchestra recording assistant
 Ted Jensen – mastering
 Sterling Sound (New York City, New York) –  mastering location
 Traci Sterling Bishir – production manager
 Wayne Brezinka – art direction
 Jan Cook – art direction
 Wayne Brezinka – design
 Christiév Carothers – creative director
 Robert Fleischauer – photography
 Gino Tanabe – stylist
 Catherine Furness – grooming

Charts

Weekly charts

Year-end charts

Certifications

References

Steven Curtis Chapman albums
1999 albums
Grammy Award for Best Pop/Contemporary Gospel Album